Mullah is an honorific title for Shia and Sunni Muslim clergy or a Muslim mosque leader. The term is also sometimes used for a person who has higher education in Islamic theology and sharia law.  

The title has also been used in some Mizrahi and Sephardic Jewish communities to refer to the community's leadership, especially religious leadership.

Etymology 
The word mullah is derived from the Arabic word mawlā, meaning "vicar", "master" and "guardian".

Usage

Historical usage 
The term has also been used among Persian Jews, Bukharan Jews, Afghan Jews, and other Central Asian Jews to refer to the community's religious and/or secular leadership. In Kaifeng, China, the historic Chinese Jews who managed the synagogue were called "mullahs".

Modern usage 

It is the term commonly used for village or neighborhood mosque leaders, who may not have high levels of religious education, in large parts of the Muslim world, particularly Iran, Turkey, Central Asia, West Asia, South Asia, Eastern Arabia, the Balkans and the Horn of Africa. In other regions a different term may be used, such as imam in the Maghreb.

In Afghanistan and Pakistan the title is given to graduates of a madrasa or Islamic school, who are then able to become a mosque leader, a teacher at a religious school, a local judge in a village or town, or to perform religious rituals. A person who is still a student at a madrasa and yet to graduate is a talib. The Afghan Taliban was formed in 1994 by men who had graduated from, or at least attended, madrasas. They called themselves taliban, the plural of talib, or "students". Many of the leaders of the Taliban were titled Mullah, although not all had completed their madrasa education. Someone who goes on to complete postgraduate religious education receives the higher title of Mawlawi.

Mullah and its variation mulla have also degenerated into a derogatory term for a Muslim priest that connotes a semiliterate, backward, often bigoted village imam.

In Iran, until the early 20th century, the term mullah was used in Iranian seminaries to refer to low-level clergy who specialized in telling stories of Ashura, rather than teaching or issuing fatwas. However, in recent years, among Shia clerics, the term ruhani (spiritual) has been promoted as an alternative to mullah and akhoond, free of pejorative connotations.

Training and duties
Ideally, a trained mullah will have studied the traditional Islamic sciences not limited to:
 Classical Arabic
 Nahw (syntax) 
 Sarf (word morphology)
 Balaaghah (rhetoric)
 Shi'r (poetry)
 Adab (literature)
 Tarikh (history) 
 Islamic law (fiqh)
 Rulings pertaining to their school of jurisprudence and the rulings of other schools of jurisprudence
 The principles of jurisprudence pertaining to their school of jurisprudence and the principles of other schools of jurisprudence
 The evidences of their school of thought for principles and rulings, the evidences of others, how they differ and why
 Islamic traditions (hadith)
 Exegesis
 The principles of exegesis
 Aqidah (Islamic creed)
 Mantiq (logic)
 Ilm-ul-Kalaam (philosophy)
 (Quran)
 The meanings of the Quran
 Exegesis
 the principles and rules of Quranic exegesis
 Tasawwuf (Sufism)

Some mullahs will specialise in certain fields after completing the above foundational studies. Common specialties are:
 Iftah – after which they qualify as a mufti and can issue a fatwa (legal ruling)
 Takhasus fil Hadith – specialisation in hadith studies
 Takhasus fil Aqidah – specialisation in aqidah studies

Such figures often have memorized the Quran and historically would memorise all the books they studied. However in the modern era they instead memorise the founding books of each field (sometimes in the form of poetry to aid memorisation).

Uneducated villagers may frequently classify a literate Muslim with a less than complete Islamic training as their "mullah" or religious cleric. Mullahs with varying levels of training lead prayers in mosques, deliver religious sermons, and perform religious ceremonies such as birth rites and funeral services. They also often teach in a type of Islamic school known as a madrasah. Three kinds of knowledge are applied most frequently in interpreting Islamic texts (i.e. the Quran, hadiths, etc.) for matters of Sharia, i.e., Islamic law.

Mullahs have frequently been involved in politics, but only recently have they served in positions of power, since Islamists seized power in Iran in 1979. In Syria, political militant groups supported by the West have taken root.

Dress

The dress of a Mullah usually consists of a turban ({عمامه} ammāme), a long coat with sleeves and buttons, similar to a cassock ( qabā), and a long gown or cloak, open at the front ( abā). The aba is usually made either of brown wool or of black muslin. It is sleeveless but has holes through which the arms may be inserted. The turban is usually white, but those who claim descent from the prophet Muhammad traditionally wear a black turban.

See also
 Allamah
 Marja'
 Maulana
 Maulvi
 Ulema

References

External links
 
 International Imam Organization

Arabic honorifics
Arabic words and phrases in Sharia
Islamic Persian honorifics
Islamic Urdu honorifics
Religious leadership roles
Titles in Bangladesh